Sovetsky is a rural locality (a settlement) in Pyatovskoye Rural Settlement, Totemsky District, Vologda Oblast, Russia. The population was 1,447 as of 2002. There are 21 streets.

Geography 
Sovetsky is located 7 km southwest of Totma (the district's administrative centre) by road. Zadnyaya is the nearest rural locality.

References 

Rural localities in Totemsky District